The Identical is a 2014 American musical drama film directed by Dustin Marcellino and written by Howard Klausner. The film was released theatrically in the United States on September 5, 2014.

Plot
After Helen and William Hemsley give birth to identical twin boys, the brothers are separated at birth during the Great Depression. Drexel Hemsley becomes an iconic 1950s rock and roll star, while Ryan Wade, born Dexter Hemsley, struggles to balance his love for music with pleasing his father. The Reverend Reece Wade and his wife Louise are sure that their adopted son has been gifted and called by God to be a preacher.

However, Ryan challenges his parents' vision for his life, and unflinchingly chooses to launch his own music career with his best friend Dino. Encouraged by his wife Jenny and employer Avi, Ryan embarks on an unpredictable, provocative path – performing the legendary music of Drexel Hemsley in sold-out venues across the country. As the brothers' destinies intertwine, Ryan discovers that Drexel is his long-lost twin brother.

Cast
 Blake Rayne as Drexel Hemsley and Dexter Hemsley / Ryan Wade
 Noah Urrea as Dexter / Ryan at age 9 
 Ray Liotta as Reece Wade
 Ashley Judd as Louise Wade
 Seth Green as Dino
 Ian Mitchell as 9-year-old Dino
 Joe Pantoliano as Avi Hirshberg
 Erin Cottrell as Jenny O'Brien
 Brian Geraghty as William Hemsley
 Chris Mulkey as Old William
 Amanda Crew as Helen Hemsley
 Waylon Payne as Tony Nash
 Danny Woodburn as Damon

Release

Critical reception
The Identical was universally panned by critics. On Rotten Tomatoes, the film holds a rating of 6%, based on 62 reviews, with an average rating of 3.3/10. The site's consensus states: "With nearly every element ringing as hollow as the ersatz Elvis at the story's core, The Identical looks destined for a bright future on the ironic viewing circuit." On Metacritic, the film has a score of 25 out of 100, based on 25 critics, indicating "generally unfavorable reviews".

Randy Cordova wrote in The Arizona Republic: "Elvis Presley made some bad movies, but let's give the King his due: He never made anything as outright awful as The Identical."

Quad-City Times film critic Linda Cook wrote: "Fans of bad movies, please note: This is a must-see. This is so bad it must be seen to be believed — "Showgirls" bad, a vision that slowly goes wrong, then terribly wrong, then hits disaster levels. In a sense, it's an Ed Wood-ian exercise in wrong."

Box office
The Identical grossed $1.6 million in its opening weekend, finishing in 12th place at the box office.

The film was pulled from theaters after playing for only three weeks, during which it grossed $2.8 million, far below its $16-million budget, making it a box office bomb.

References

External links
 
 
 
 
Movie Review: The Identical

2014 films
2010s musical drama films
American independent films
American musical drama films
2014 independent films
Films about evangelicalism
Films about music and musicians
Films about twin brothers
Films set in the 1950s
Films set in the 1960s
Films shot in Tennessee
2014 drama films
2010s English-language films
2010s American films